Kuwait competed at the 2000 Summer Olympics in Sydney, Australia. The nation won its first Olympic medal at these Games. 29 competitors, all men, took part in ten events in six sports.

Medalists

Athletics

Men's 400m
Fawzi Al Shammari
 Round 1 – 46.38 (did not advance)

Men's 4 × 400 m
Musad Al Azimi, Badar Al Fulaij, Mishal Al Harbi, Fawzi Al Shammari
 Round 1 – DQ (did not advance)

Fencing

One fencer represented Kuwait in 2000.

Men's foil
 Abdul Muhsen Ali

Football

Men's team competition
Team Roster

 ( 1.) Shehab Kankune
 ( 2.) Naser Al-Omran
 ( 3.) Jamal Mubarak
 ( 4.) Bader Najem
 ( 5.) Abdullah Husan
 ( 6.) Nawaf Humaidan
 ( 7.) Adel Al-Anezi
 ( 8.) Naser Al-Othman
 ( 9.) Bashar Abdulaziz
 ( 10.) Faraj Saeed
 ( 11.) Abdullah Saihan
 ( 12.) Hamad Al-Tayyar
 ( 13.) Sadoun Salman
 ( 14.) Khalaf Al-Mutairi
 ( 15.) Saleh Al-Buraiki
 ( 16.) Yousef Zayed
 ( 17.) Esam Al-Kandari
 ( 18.) Nawaf Al-Khaldi

Group C

Shooting

Swimming

Men's 100m Backstroke
Faisal Al Mahmeed
 Preliminary Heat – 01:05.17 (did not advance)

Men's 200m Individual Medley
Sultan Altotaibi
 Preliminary Heat – 02:16.23 (did not advance)

Taekwondo

Notes
Wallechinsky, David (2004). The Complete Book of the Summer Olympics (Athens 2004 Edition). Toronto, Canada. . 
International Olympic Committee (2001). The Results. Retrieved 12 November 2005.
Sydney Organising Committee for the Olympic Games (2001). Official Report of the XXVII Olympiad Volume 1: Preparing for the Games. Retrieved 20 November 2005.
Sydney Organising Committee for the Olympic Games (2001). Official Report of the XXVII Olympiad Volume 2: Celebrating the Games. Retrieved 20 November 2005.
Sydney Organising Committee for the Olympic Games (2001). The Results. Retrieved 20 November 2005.
International Olympic Committee Web Site

References

Nations at the 2000 Summer Olympics
2000
Summer Olympics